Hery or Héry may refer to:

People
 Hery Prasetyo (born 1985), Indonesian footballer
 Hery Setaharinaivomanjato Raharisaina, Malagasy politician
 Hery Rajaonarimampianina (born 1958), Malagasy politician, President of Madagascar from 2014 to 2018
 Hery (Ancient Egyptian), Ancient Egyptian official - see TT12
 Bastien Héry (born 1992), Malagasy footballer
 Franck Héry (born 1993), French footballer
 Louis Héry (fabulist) (1801–1856), French fabulist, translator into Creole of some of La Fontaine's fables 
 Louis Héry (driver) (died 1956), French race car driver - see List of driver deaths in motorsport
 Luc Héry (born 1961), French classical violinist

Places
 Héry, Nièvre, France, a commune
 Héry, Yonne, France, a commune

See also
French communes:
 Héry-sur-Alby, Haute-Savoie department
 Dompierre-sur-Héry, Nièvre department
 Pont-d'Héry, Jura department
 Villard-d'Héry, Savoie department